{{DISPLAYTITLE:C2H4O3}}
C2H4O3 may refer to:

Compounds sharing the molecular formula:
Glycolic acid (also known as hydroacetic acid or hydroxyacetic acid)
Peracetic acid (also known as peroxyacetic acid)